Uncertainty theory is a branch of mathematics based on normality, monotonicity, self-duality, countable subadditivity, and product measure axioms.

Mathematical measures of the likelihood of an event being true include probability theory, capacity, fuzzy logic, possibility, and credibility, as well as uncertainty.

Four axioms
Axiom 1. (Normality Axiom) .

Axiom 2. (Self-Duality Axiom) .

Axiom 3. (Countable Subadditivity Axiom) For every countable sequence of events Λ1, Λ2, ..., we have
.

Axiom 4. Then the product uncertain measure  is an uncertain measure on the product σ-algebra satisfying
.

Principle. (Maximum Uncertainty Principle) For any event, if there are multiple reasonable values that an uncertain measure may take, then the value as close to 0.5 as possible is assigned to the event.

Uncertain variables
An uncertain variable is a measurable function ξ from an uncertainty space  to the set of real numbers, i.e., for any Borel set B of real numbers, the set 
 is an event.

Uncertainty distribution
Uncertainty distribution is inducted to describe uncertain variables.

Independence
Definition: The uncertain variables  are said to be independent if 

for any Borel sets  of real numbers.

Theorem 1: The uncertain variables  are independent if 

for any Borel sets  of real numbers.

Theorem 2: Let  be independent uncertain variables, and  measurable functions. Then  are independent uncertain variables.

Theorem 3: Let  be uncertainty distributions of independent uncertain variables  respectively, and  the joint uncertainty distribution of uncertain vector . If  are independent, then we have 

for any real numbers .

Operational law
Theorem: Let  be independent uncertain variables, and  a measurable function. Then  is an uncertain variable such that

where  are Borel sets, and  means  for any.

Expected Value
Definition: Let  be an uncertain variable.

provided that at least one of the two integrals is finite.

Theorem 1: Let  be an uncertain variable with uncertainty distribution . If the expected value exists, then 

Theorem 2: Let  be an uncertain variable with regular uncertainty distribution . If the expected value exists, then 

Theorem 3: Let  and  be independent uncertain variables with finite expected values.

Variance
Definition: Let  be an uncertain variable with finite expected value .

Critical value
Then

Theorem 1: Let  be an uncertain variable with regular uncertainty distribution . Then its α-optimistic value and α-pessimistic value are 
,
.

Then we have
 if , then ;
 if , then .

Then we have

,

,

,

,

,

.

Entropy
Definition: Let  be an uncertain variable with uncertainty distribution . Then its entropy is defined by

where .

Theorem 1(Dai and Chen): Let  be an uncertain variable with regular uncertainty distribution . Then

Theorem 2: Let  and  be independent uncertain variables.

Theorem 3: Let  be an uncertain variable whose uncertainty distribution is arbitrary but the expected value  and variance . Then

Inequalities
Theorem 1(Liu, Markov Inequality): Let  be an uncertain variable.

Theorem 2 (Liu, Chebyshev Inequality) Let  be an uncertain variable whose variance  exists. Then for any given number , we have

Then we have

Then we have

Convergence concept
Definition 1: Suppose that  are uncertain variables defined on the uncertainty space . The sequence  is said to be convergent a.s. to  if there exists an event  with  such that

for every . In that case we write ,a.s.

Definition 2: Suppose that  are uncertain variables. We say that the sequence  converges in measure to  if

for every .

Definition 3: Suppose that  are uncertain variables with finite expected values. We say that the sequence  converges in mean to  if
.

Definition 4: Suppose that  are uncertainty distributions of uncertain variables , respectively.

Theorem 1: Convergence in Mean  Convergence in Measure  Convergence in Distribution. 
However, Convergence in Mean  Convergence Almost Surely  Convergence in Distribution.

Conditional uncertainty
Then the conditional uncertain measure of A given B is defined by

Then M{·|B} defined by Definition 1 is an uncertain measure, and is an uncertainty space.

A conditional uncertain variable of  given B is a measurable function  from the conditional uncertainty space  to the set of real numbers such that
.

Definition 3: The conditional uncertainty distribution  of an uncertain variable  given B is defined by

provided that .

Then the conditional uncertainty distribution of  given  is

Then the conditional uncertainty distribution of  given  is

Definition 4: Let  be an uncertain variable. Then the conditional expected value of  given B is defined by

provided that at least one of the two integrals is finite.

References

Sources
 Xin Gao, Some Properties of Continuous Uncertain Measure, International Journal of Uncertainty, Fuzziness and Knowledge-Based Systems, Vol.17, No.3, 419-426, 2009.
 Cuilian You, Some Convergence Theorems of Uncertain Sequences, Mathematical and Computer Modelling, Vol.49, Nos.3-4, 482-487, 2009.
 Yuhan Liu, How to Generate Uncertain Measures, Proceedings of Tenth National Youth Conference on Information and Management Sciences, August 3–7, 2008, Luoyang, pp. 23–26.
 Baoding Liu, Uncertainty Theory, 4th ed., Springer-Verlag, Berlin,  2009
 Baoding Liu, Some Research Problems in Uncertainty Theory, Journal of Uncertain Systems, Vol.3, No.1, 3-10, 2009.
 Yang Zuo, Xiaoyu Ji, Theoretical Foundation of Uncertain Dominance, Proceedings of the Eighth International Conference on Information and Management Sciences, Kunming, China, July 20–28, 2009, pp. 827–832.
 Yuhan Liu and Minghu Ha, Expected Value of Function of Uncertain Variables, Proceedings of the Eighth International Conference on Information and Management Sciences, Kunming, China, July 20–28, 2009, pp. 779–781.
 Zhongfeng Qin, On Lognormal Uncertain Variable, Proceedings of the Eighth International Conference on Information and Management Sciences, Kunming, China, July 20–28, 2009, pp. 753–755.
 Jin Peng, Value at Risk and Tail Value at Risk in Uncertain Environment, Proceedings of the Eighth International Conference on Information and Management Sciences, Kunming, China, July 20–28, 2009, pp. 787–793.
 Yi Peng, U-Curve and U-Coefficient in Uncertain Environment, Proceedings of the Eighth International Conference on Information and Management Sciences, Kunming, China, July 20–28, 2009, pp. 815–820.
 Wei Liu, Jiuping Xu, Some Properties on Expected Value Operator for Uncertain Variables, Proceedings of the Eighth International Conference on Information and Management Sciences, Kunming, China, July 20–28, 2009, pp. 808–811.
 Xiaohu Yang, Moments and Tails Inequality within the Framework of Uncertainty Theory, Proceedings of the Eighth International Conference on Information and Management Sciences, Kunming, China, July 20–28, 2009, pp. 812–814.
 Yuan Gao, Analysis of k-out-of-n System with Uncertain Lifetimes, Proceedings of the Eighth International Conference on Information and Management Sciences, Kunming, China, July 20–28, 2009, pp. 794–797.
 Xin Gao, Shuzhen Sun, Variance Formula for Trapezoidal Uncertain Variables, Proceedings of the Eighth International Conference on Information and Management Sciences, Kunming, China, July 20–28, 2009, pp. 853–855.
 Zixiong Peng, A Sufficient and Necessary Condition of Product Uncertain Null Set, Proceedings of the Eighth International Conference on Information and Management Sciences, Kunming, China, July 20–28, 2009, pp. 798–801.

Probability theory
Fuzzy logic